La suerte en tus manos is a film co-produced by Argentina, Brazil and Spain directed by Daniel Burman based on his own script written in collaboration with Sergio Dubcovsky which premiered on March 29, 2012, starring Norma Aleandro, Jorge Drexler, Valeria Bertuccelli and Gabriel Schultz. Atzmus rock band makes an appearance, with its leading vocalist portraying a rabbi.

Cast 
 Jorge Drexler as Uriel
 Valeria Bertuccelli as Gloria
 Norma Aleandro as Susan
 Gabriel Schultz as Germán
 Paloma Álvarez Maldonado as Sara
 Lucciano Pizzichini as Otto
 Sura Sepúlveda as Fagner Paván
 Luis Brandoni as Dr. Weiss

References

External links
 

2012 films
Argentine comedy films
Brazilian comedy films
Spanish comedy films
Films shot in Buenos Aires
2012 comedy films
Films directed by Daniel Burman
2010s Argentine films
2010s Spanish-language films